French-Moroccan singer and rapper Lartiste has released six studio albums.

Albums

Others
2006: "Évasion" (maxi)
2010: Rap 1.9 (mixtape)
2017: Projet 000

Singles

As lead artist

*Did not appear in the official Belgian Ultratop 50 charts, but rather in the bubbling under Ultratip charts.

As featured artist

*Did not appear in the official Belgian Ultratop 50 charts, but rather in the bubbling under Ultratip charts.

Other charted songs

*Did not appear in the official Belgian Ultratop 50 charts, but rather in the bubbling under Ultratip charts.

References

Discographies of French artists
Hip hop discographies
Contemporary R&B discographies
Discographies of Moroccan artists